EpiCeram (EpiCeram Skin Barrier Emulsion) is a topical non-steroidal skin cream.
Based on the research of Peter M. Elias, it is made up of ceramides, free fatty acids, and cholesterol, and is designed to treat atopic dermatitis, a type of eczema. Ceragenix obtained marketing clearance from the U.S. Food and Drug Administration in April 2006. This prescription medical device works as a moisturizer and barrier cream. In the US, it requires prescription and was launched in October 2008 by Promius Pharma. EpiCeram was acquired by PuraCap Pharmaceutical LLC in 2010.

In a company-sponsored clinical study reported by Jeffrey L. Sugarman of the Department of Dermatology at the University of California, San Francisco and Lawrence Charles Parish of the Department of Dermatology and Cutaneous Biology at the Jefferson Medical College of Thomas Jefferson University in Philadelphia, EpiCeram was shown to have comparable efficacy to a mid-potent steroid in a clinical study after 28 days of treatment, reducing disease severity, improvement in pruritus and improving sleep habits.

EpiCeram obtained Health Canada medical device license in September 2009 and was launched by Pediapharm in November of the same year. It is sold under prescription.

References

External links 
  Entry at ClinicalTrials.gov
  Entry at ClinicalTrials.gov

Dermatologic drugs